Mary Black Andrews is an American politician from Maine. Andrews served as a Republican State Senator from Maine's 1st District, representing part of York County, including her residence in York. She had previously been elected to three consecutive two-year terms in the Maine House of Representatives (1998–2004). She did not seek re-election following her first term in the Senate and was replaced by Peter Bowman (D-Kittery).

While in the Maine Legislature, Andrews was a vocal opponent of Maine's tax on gasoline and diesel.

After leaving the Senate, Andrews was elected to the York Board of Selectmen. In May 2014, she was elected chairperson.

References

Year of birth missing (living people)
Living people
People from York, Maine
Republican Party members of the Maine House of Representatives
Republican Party Maine state senators
Maine city council members
Women state legislators in Maine
Women city councillors in Maine
21st-century American politicians
21st-century American women politicians